Louis John Baggott (3 February 1891 – 9 April 1965) was an Anglican priest and author.

Baggott was educated at Queens' College, Cambridge and Ridley Hall, Cambridge. He was ordained deacon in 1915, and Priest in 1916. After a curacy at St Andrew, Drypool he was a chaplain to the Forces. When peace returned he was chaplain at the Tower of London. He was a curate at Bath Abbey from 1920 to 1923; vicar of Christ Church, Sefton Park from 1923 to 1928; rector of Newcastle-under-Lyme from 1928 to 1933; vicar of Clifton from 1933 to 1936; rural dean of Clifton from 1935 to 1936; vicar of Beverley Minster with Tickton from 1936 to 1942; and vicar of Great Yarmouth from 1942 to 1955. archdeacon of Norfolk and Residentiary Canon of Norwich Cathedral from 1955 until his retirement in 1962.

Notes

1891 births
1965 deaths
20th-century English Anglican priests
Archdeacons of Norfolk
Alumni of Queens' College, Cambridge
Alumni of Ridley Hall, Cambridge